Lesliganj block is one of the administrative  blocks of Palamu district, Jharkhand state, India.

History
Lesliganj is an historic place; it was an  army camp during British rule in India and hence also called Chawni (means "place where force makes camp"). The place has been named after Matthew Leslie who was the Collector and Magistrate of Ramgarh Hill tract in the 1780s. This is the place where the martyr brothers Nilamber and Pitamber were hanged by the British. Therefore, there is a demand from some sections of people to rename it as Nilamber and Pitamber Nagar.

Location in Jharkhand 
Lesliganj is a town in Palamu District in the Indian state of Jharkhand. It is located about 18 km from Daltonganj, the district headquarters and around 210 km from State capital Ranchi. It is a major town and is close to the townships of Satbarwa (16 km south), Kundri (6 km east) and Patan (19 km north).

Governance and development
Although Lesliganj is a very old town and has its own historic importance, it still remains underdeveloped and largely poor due to many unstable governments in the recent history of the state. Like other areas in Jharkhand, Lesliganj still remains undeveloped, partly due to neglect of the government and partly due to the naxal presence in the interior areas.

Few villages are yet to receive electricity connections and those villages which have it, hardly get the supply continuously.

Lesliganj caters to the day-to-day needs of the locals through the temporary bazaar which sits thrice a week i.e. on Sundays, Tuesdays, and Thursdays.

Other places where the bazaars are held are Kundri, Oriya, Bhakasi, Dhangaon and Getha normally bi-weekly or thrice in a week.

Modes of transport 
Nearest airport is Ranchi Airport. Daltonganj Railway Station on the Ranchi-Garhwa line is the nearest railhead. Lesliganj is linked with various parts of the district by roads.

Most villages of the block do not have an all-weather road.

Attractions 
Betla National Park is a nearby attraction not quite in Lesliganj but accessible from Daltonganj.

Nearby villages 
Nearby villages are Jamundih (0 km), Kurain Patra (1.614 km), Darudih (1.800 km), Purnadih (3.219 km), Haratua (3.838 km), Sangbar (3.991 km), Juru (5.607 km) Amwa khurd(8.5;km) Phulang(8.2,KM) Ramsagar(8.2,KM)
 
Other villages in the Lesliganj block include Murmusi, Chaura, Dabara, Darudih, Haratua, Jamundih, Juru, Kott Khas, Kundari, Kurain Patra, Naudiha, Oriya Kalan, Pahari Khurd, Pahari Kala, Kirto, Nawadih-Bhakasi.

Post offices 
Lesliganj has a post office having pin Code 822118. Other post offices in the block are Kundari, Sangbar, Banshikhurd, Pagar Khurd, Rajwadih, Dhangaon etc.

Banks 
It has quite a few number of prominent banks making the things easy for the villagers. The banks in and around Lesliganj include :-

 State Bank of India, Lesliganj 
 Punjab National Bank, Chainpur 
 State Bank of India, Mohammadganj 
 Punjab National Bank, Manatu 
 State Bank of India, Murubar
 Gramin Bank, Lesliganj

See also
 Palamu Loksabha constituency
 Jharkhand Legislative Assembly
 Jharkhand
 Palamu

References 
 Blocks of Palamu district

Community development blocks in Jharkhand
Community development blocks in Palamu district